Bubbling Over is the twelfth solo studio album by American singer-songwriter Dolly Parton. It was released on September 10, 1973, by RCA Victor.  The album cover photo was shot by Nashville photographer Les Leverett near the fountain at the Country Music Hall of Fame.

The album's single, "Traveling Man", is a new version of a song previously included on her 1971 Coat of Many Colors album. "The Beginning" would later be recorded as a duet with Porter Wagoner and included on their 1975 album, Say Forever You'll Be Mine.

Critical reception

Billboard published a review in the issue dated September 22, 1973, which said, "Dolly must write a dozen or so hits a week, and since Porter Wagoner resumed his writing career, he's almost keeping pace. The two of them supply the bulk of the material for this, another in the
huge collection of Dolly's album outputs, and it – as the others before it – tops the last one out. It ranges from the happy uptempo to the tearful ballad, and no one fills this range better than Dolly." the review noted "Love with Me", "Pleasant as May", and "Love, You're So Beautiful Tonight" as the best cuts on the album, with a note to record dealers praising Les Leverett's "excellent" cover art.

In the issue dated October 6, 1973, Cashbox published a review that said, "An eagerly awaited album, Dolly Parton's new release will elicit immediate effervescence upon the initial listening, but then again isn’t that what bubbling over is all about! "Traveling Man", Dolly's last chart single is included on the album. An easy listening blend of country music at its finest this new album will prove an inevitable success for the inimitable Miss Parton. Some of the more outstanding tracks are "Bubbling Over", "Sometimes an Old Memory Gets in My Eye", and "Love with Me"."

Commercial performance
The album peaked at No. 14 on the US Billboard Hot Country LPs chart.

The album's only single, "Traveling Man", was released in April 1973 and peaked at No. 20 on the US Billboard Hot Country Singles chart. The single peaked at No. 12 in Canada on the RPM Country Singles chart.

Track listing

Personnel
Adapted from the album liner notes.
Bob Ferguson – producer
Les Leverett – photography
Al Pachucki – recording engineer
Dolly Parton – lead vocals
Tom Pick – recording engineer
Mike Shockley – recording technician
Roy Shockley – recording technician

Charts
Album

Singles

References

Dolly Parton albums
1973 albums
Albums produced by Bob Ferguson (music)
RCA Records albums